Chintamani Tryambak Khanolkar (C. T. Khanolkar) (8 March 1930 – 26 April 1976) was a Marathi writer from Maharashtra, India. He wrote poetry under the name "Arati Prabhu" and prose under his own name. He received a Sangeet Natak Akademi Award in 1976 for his playwriting and a Sahitya Akademi Award in 1978 for his collection of poems .

Early life

Khanolkar was born on 8 March 1930 in the village of Baglanchi Rai near Vengurla in Maharashtra into a family with meagre means. He started writing poetry in 1950 and received acclaim for his poem , which featured in the February edition of Marathi literary journal  in 1954. Khanolkar completed his education up to matriculation and began running the family business of "Khanaval" (a small hotel). However, the business did not do well and Khanolkar decided to leave his village for Mumbai in search of livelihood in 1959.

Initial years in Mumbai

Khanolkar was known in the Marathi literary circles even before his arrival in the city due to his poems. He managed to get a job in Mumbai Akashwani (State Radio) with the help of a fellow poet Mangesh Padgaonkar, but he had to give up his job in 1961 because of his eccentric behaviour. This made his initial years in Mumbai full of financial difficulties.

Poetry

 was his first published collection of poems, in 1959. After that, in 1962 he published , another collection of poems. Both collections have a majority of poems which portray agitation and distress. Reminiscent agitation is the chief emotion in the initial collection of his poems. His poems do not feature romantic descriptions of a lover as do the poems of his contemporaries. His poems might begin with a description of the lover, but the intensity of hurt hits him with such force that the poem turns into an ode to the suffering.

And so his hurt intensifies as the poem progresses.

Compared with these poems, his collection published in Nakshtrache Dene in 1975 are a great deal more pleasant; he appears to have overcome his suffering. These poems are conversational and theatrical.

One poem from this set is Aad Yete Reet:

This poem describes the suggested romance between a husband and wife. The intensity of romance in these lines, despite the creative control in them is proof of his mature image.

Aarti Prabhu's poems give a feeling of a strong background of nature. Correct and perfect use of words is the hallmark of his poems based on nature.
Several of Khanolkar's poems were put to music by famous music director Pt. Hridayanath Mangeshkar and have become some of the masterpieces of Marthi music. Some of these songs include "", "" and "".

Novels

Khanolkar's stories had themes of complexity, non-debatable heavenly power, concepts of good versus evil, religious faith, desires that take mankind to any level, the finer as well as horrifying façade of nature, and the venomous disposition of mankind. A telefilm on his novel Ganuraya was made by Satyadev Dubey, featuring Chetan Datar as Ganuraya.

Plays

Khanolkar carried out several experiments in Marathi Theatre. Khanolkar's play  is considered a modern Marathi classic, unique in form and content. In this play Khanolkar attempted to harness the resources of Medieval Marathi dramatic forms. Khanolkar's play  was an adaptation of Brecht's The Caucasian Chalk Circle.

Works adapted
, a Hindi film based on his play , was made in 1985 by Amol Palekar. It featured Amol Palekar and Deepti Naval. 
Vijaya Mehta's production of Khanolkar play,  is considered a landmark in contemporary Indian theatre.

Awards

Khanolkar received a Sangeet Nataka Academy Award in 1976 for his playwriting. His collection of poems  posthumously received a Sahitya Akademi Award in 1978.

List of literary work

Collections of poems
 Jogva (जोगवा) (1959)
 Divelagan (दिवेलागण) (1962)
 Nakshatranche Dene (नक्षत्रांचे देणे) (1975)

Collection of stories
 Sanai (सनई) (1964)
 Rakhi Pakharu (राखी पाखरू) (1971)
 Chapha Ani Dewachi Aai (चाफा आणि देवाची आई) (1975)

Novels
 Ratra Kali Ghagar Kali (रात्र काळी घागर काळी) (1962)
 Ajagar (अजगर) (1965)
 Kondura (कोंडुरा) (1966)
 Trishanku (त्रिशंकु) (1968)
 Ganuraya Ani Chani (गणुराय आणि चानी) (1970)
 Pishacch (पिशाच्च) (1970)
 Aganchar (अगंचर) (1970)
 Pashan Palawi (पाषाण पालवी) (1976)
  Adnyat Kabutare 1970

Plays
 Ek Shunya Bajirao (एक शून्य बाजीराव) (1966)
 Sagesoyare (सगेसोयरे) (1967)
 Avadhya (अवध्य) (1972)
 Kalay Tasmai Namaha (कालाय तस्मै नमः) (1972)
 Ajab Nyay Wartulacha'' (अजब न्याय वर्तुळाचा) (1974)

References

 Arvachin Kavyadarshan –Dr. Akshaykumar Kale
 Modern Indian Literature, An Anthology, Volume 1, Edited by K.M. George, 1992, Sahitya Academy, New Delhi
 Sankshipta Vangmay Kosh – (1920 to 2003 period) – Editor Prabha Ganorkar
 Marathi Saraswat – Editor Anant Lakshman Joshi
 Maharashtra Sahitya Patrika ¬ – May, June 1976

Marathi-language writers
1930 births
1976 deaths
People from Sindhudurg district
Indian male dramatists and playwrights
Recipients of the Sahitya Akademi Award in Marathi
Recipients of the Sangeet Natak Akademi Award
20th-century Indian dramatists and playwrights
Writers from Mumbai
Poets from Maharashtra
Dramatists and playwrights from Maharashtra
Novelists from Maharashtra
20th-century Indian male writers
20th-century pseudonymous writers